Manastirsko Dolenci is a village in the municipality of Kičevo, North Macedonia. It used to be part of the former Drugovo Municipality. It is home to the 14th-century Kičevo Monastery.

History
There are nine archaeological sites within Manastrisko Dolenci. One of these is the former settlement called Arbanaški, literally meaning Albanian, from which archaeological remains have been excavated.

Demographics
According to the 2002 census, the village had a total of 109 inhabitants. Ethnic groups in the village include:

Macedonians 108
Serbs 1

References

Villages in Kičevo Municipality